Edward Dunlap Smith (1807 – March 28, 1883) was a Presbyterian clergyman and served as Chaplain of the United States House of Representatives (1834–1835).

Early life 

Edward Dunlap Smith was born in Philadelphia, Pennsylvania, the son of a prominent ironmaster. He was a graduate of Princeton University, the University of Virginia and Princeton Theological Seminary.

Ministry 

Smith served a Presbyterian church in Washington, D.C., before moving to New York City's Old Chelsea Presbyterian Church (West 22nd Street) in 1838 and preached there for 30 years before retiring.

Chaplain of the House of Representatives 

On Dec. 1, 1834, Rev. Edward Dunlap Smith was appointed chaplain of the United States House of Representatives.

Personal life 

Smith met his wife Jane Blair Cary, daughter Virginia Randolph and Wilson Jefferson Cary, while a student at the University of Virginia. The Smiths were the parents of four sons, including, Archibald Cary Smith the celebrated marine architect, and two daughters.

References 

1807 births
1883 deaths
American Presbyterian ministers
Princeton University alumni
University of Virginia alumni
Princeton Theological Seminary alumni
Chaplains of the United States House of Representatives
19th-century American clergy